Tomáš Martinec (born 5 March 1976) is a retired Czech-German ice hockey player. He competed in the men's tournament at the 2006 Winter Olympics. In 2019 he became the head coach of EA Steiermark U18 of the EBJL in Austria  His father is Vladimír Martinec, a Czech ice hockey coach and former player.

Career statistics

Regular season and playoffs

International

References

1976 births
Living people
Adler Mannheim players
Czechoslovak emigrants to West Germany
ESV Kaufbeuren players
German people of Czech descent
Hannover Scorpions players
HC Slezan Opava players
HC ZUBR Přerov players
Heilbronner Falken players
Ice hockey players at the 2006 Winter Olympics
Iserlohn Roosters players
Nürnberg Ice Tigers players
Olympic ice hockey players of Germany
Sportspeople from Pardubice
Sportspeople from Swabia (Bavaria)
German ice hockey left wingers